Irina Vlasova (born 9 February 1957) is a Russian former freestyle swimmer. She competed in four events at the 1976 Summer Olympics representing the Soviet Union.

References

External links
 

1957 births
Living people
Russian female freestyle swimmers
Olympic swimmers of the Soviet Union
Swimmers at the 1976 Summer Olympics
Sportspeople from Ivanovo
Soviet female freestyle swimmers